Prefoldin subunit 5 is a protein that in humans is encoded by the PFDN5 gene.

This gene encodes a member of the prefoldin alpha subunit family. The encoded protein is one of six subunits of prefoldin, a molecular chaperone complex that binds and stabilizes newly synthesized polypeptides, thereby allowing them to fold correctly. The complex, consisting of two alpha and four beta subunits, forms a double beta barrel assembly with six protruding coiled-coils. The encoded protein may also repress the transcriptional activity of the proto-oncogene c-Myc. Alternatively spliced transcript variants encoding different isoforms have been described.

Interactions 

PFDN5 has been shown to interact with Myc.

References

Further reading